The Rhode Island Interscholastic League (RIIL) is an organization that runs and regulates interscholastic high school activities in the U.S. state of Rhode Island. A total of 54 public and private schools participate in the league and about 20,000 students annually compete in RIIL sanctioned events.

Sports offered

Fall
Boys' & Girls' Cross Country
Girls' Field Hockey
Football
Girls' Tennis
Boys' & Girls' Soccer
Girls' Volleyball

Winter
Boys' & Girls' Basketball
Competition Cheerleading
Gymnastics
Boys' & Girls' hockey
Boys' & Girls' Indoor Track
Boys' & Girls' Swimming
Wrestling

Spring
Baseball
Girls' Fastpitch softball
Boys' & Girls' Lacrosse
Golf
Boys' Tennis
Boys' & Girls' Outdoor Track
Unified Basketball
Source

Mount St. Charles hockey dynasty
The Mount Saint Charles Academy Mounties boys' ice hockey team captured the RIIL state title 26 times in a row from 1978 to 2003.

See also
Rhode Island High School Championships

References

External links
Official Site

High school sports associations in the United States
Sports organizations established in 1932
Sports in Rhode Island